Rugun is a rural locality (a selo) in Ikrinsky Selsoviet, Kurakhsky District, Republic of Dagestan, Russia. The population was 151 as of 2010.

Geography 
Rugun is located 34 km northeast of Kurakh (the district's administrative centre) by road, on the Rugunchay River. Ikra and Khatsug are the nearest rural localities.

Nationalities 
Lezgins live there.

References 

Rural localities in Kurakhsky District